Harris Academy Upper Norwood (formerly Westwood High School for Girls and then Westwood Girls' College for Languages and Arts and Ingram County Secondary Girls' School) was a mixed secondary school with academy status, located in the Upper Norwood area of the London Borough of Croydon, England. The school was sponsored by the Harris Federation.

History
The school was formerly a community school under the direct control of Croydon London Borough Council. However the school was rated as "inadequate" in its most recent Ofsted inspection report and was put into special measures in January 2013. The governors of the school decided to pursue academy status, with the school becoming part of the Harris Federation in September 2013. The school was then renamed Harris Academy Upper Norwood.

Harris Academy Upper Norwood offered GCSEs, BTECs and OCR Nationals as programmes of study for pupils. The school specialised in languages and the arts, and had additional facilities for the specialisms.

In September 2014, the school amalgamated with Harris Academy South Norwood, sharing teachers and a sixth form campus.

References

External links
Harris Academy Upper Norwood official website
Westwood Girls' College official website

Defunct schools in the London Borough of Croydon
Educational institutions established in 1958
1958 establishments in England
Educational institutions disestablished in 2014
2014 disestablishments in England
Upper Norwood